Kim Jong Yang (born 30 October 1961) is a South Korean police officer and former President of Interpol.

Prior to his Interpol career, Kim was Commissioner of Gyeonggi Provincial Police Agency, the law enforcement agency for South Korea's most populous province. As a police chief, Kim took part in efforts to spread South Korean policing strategies to other nations, including the Philippines, through financial assistance and training programs.

In 2015 Kim was elected as Interpol's vice-president for Asia.

Following the arrest and detainment of Interpol President Meng Hongwei in China, Kim took on the role of Acting President.

Although Interpol Vice-President and Russian interior ministry official Alexander Prokopchuk had been widely tipped to be Meng's successor, at a meeting in Dubai on 18–21 November 2018 Kim was elected to serve the remaining two years of Meng's term. Prokopchuk's candidacy had been opposed by Western nations, which had objected to the Russian government's abuses of Interpol red notices to target dissidents and political opponents.

References 

1961 births
Living people
Interpol officials
People from Changwon
Korea University alumni
Seoul National University alumni
Dongguk University alumni
South Korean police officers